Vĩnh Ninh may refer to several places in Vietnam, including:

 , a ward of Huế.
 Vĩnh Ninh, Quảng Bình, a rural commune of Quảng Ninh District.
 , a rural commune of Vĩnh Tường District.